Equatorial Africa is an ambiguous term that sometimes is used to refer either to the equatorial region of Sub-Saharan Africa traversed by the Equator, more broadly to tropical Africa or in a biological and geo-environmental sense to the intra-tropical African rainforest region.

See also
 Central Africa
 French Equatorial Africa
 Sahara
 Sahel
 Sudan (region)
 Tropics

References

External links 
 
 

Central Africa
Geography of Africa